Mount Ferranto is a mountain which forms the extreme southwest projection of the main massif of the Fosdick Mountains, in the Ford Ranges of Marie Byrd Land, Antarctica. It was discovered by a sledging party of the Byrd Antarctic Expedition which visited this area in November–December 1934, and was named for Felix Ferranto, a radio and tractor operator with the United States Antarctic Service (1939–41).

References 

Mountains of Marie Byrd Land